Giant Steps is the fifth studio album by jazz musician John Coltrane as leader. It was released in February 1960 on Atlantic Records. This was his first album as leader for Atlantic Records, with which he had signed a new contract the previous year. The record is regarded as one of the most influential jazz albums of all time. Many of its tracks have become practice templates for jazz saxophonists. In 2004, it was one of fifty recordings chosen that year by the Library of Congress to be added to the National Recording Registry. It attained gold record status in 2018, having sold 500,000 copies.

Two tracks, "Naima" and "Syeeda's Song Flute", are respectively named after Coltrane's wife at the time and her daughter, whom he adopted. A third, "Mr. P.C.", takes its name from the initials of bassist Paul Chambers, who played on the album. A fourth, "Cousin Mary", is named in honor of Mary Lyerly, Coltrane's younger cousin.

Background
In 1959, Miles Davis's business manager Harold Lovett negotiated a record contract for Coltrane with Atlantic, the terms of which included a $7,000 annual guarantee. Initial sessions for this album, the second recording date for Coltrane under his new contract after a January 15 date led by Milt Jackson, took place on March 26, 1959. Coltrane was dissatisfied with the results of this session with Cedar Walton and Lex Humphries, and hence they were not used for the album, but appeared on subsequent compilations and reissues. Principal recording for the album took place on May 4 and 5, two weeks after Coltrane had participated in the final session for Kind of Blue. The track "Naima" was recorded on December 2 with Coltrane's bandmates, the rhythm section from the Miles Davis Quintet, who would provide the backing for most of his next album, Coltrane Jazz.

Coltrane's improvisation exemplifies the melodic phrasing that came to be known as sheets of sound, and features his explorations into third-related chord movements that came to be known as Coltrane changes. The Giant Steps chord progression consists of a distinctive set of chords that create key centers a major third apart. Jazz musicians ever since have used it as a practice piece, its difficult chord changes presenting a "kind of ultimate harmonic challenge", and serving as a gateway into modern jazz improvisation. Several pieces on this album went on to become jazz standards, most prominently "Naima" and "Giant Steps".

Reception

The Penguin Guide to Jazz selected this album as part of its suggested "Core Collection" calling it "Trane's first genuinely iconic record." In 2003, the album was ranked number 102 on Rolling Stone magazine's list of The 500 Greatest Albums of All Time, 103 in a 2012 revised list, and 232 in a 2020 revised list.

In 2000 it was voted number 764 in Colin Larkin's All Time Top 1000 Albums.

On March 3, 1998, Rhino Records reissued Giant Steps as part of its Atlantic 50th Anniversary Jazz Gallery series. Included were eight bonus tracks, five of which had appeared in 1975 on the Atlantic compilation Alternate Takes, the remaining three earlier issued on The Heavyweight Champion: The Complete Atlantic Recordings in 1995.

Track listing

Recording dates:

Thursday March 26, 1959:
Tracks 8, 9, 13, 14

Monday May 4, 1959:
Tracks 3, 4, 11

Tuesday May 5, 1959:
Tracks 1, 2, 5, 7, 10, 12 and 15

Wednesday December 2, 1959:
Track 6

Personnel
Musicians
 John Coltrane – tenor saxophone
 Tommy Flanagan – piano
 Wynton Kelly – piano on "Naima"
 Paul Chambers – bass
 Art Taylor – drums
 Jimmy Cobb – drums on "Naima"
 Cedar Walton – piano on "Giant Steps" and “Naima" alternate versions
 Lex Humphries – drums on "Giant Steps" and “Naima" alternate versions

Production
 Nesuhi Ertegün – producer
 Tom Dowd, Phil Iehle – engineer
 Lee Friedlander – photography
 Marvin Israel – cover design
 Nat Hentoff – liner notes
 Bob Carlton, Patrick Milligan – reissue supervision
 Bill Inglot, Dan Hersch – digital remastering
 Rachel Gutek – reissue design
 Hugh Brown – reissue art direction
 Vanessa Atkins, Steven Chean, Julee Stover – reissue editorial supervision
 Ted Meyers, Elizabeth Pavone – reissue editorial coordination

Release history
 1960 – Atlantic Records SD 1311, vinyl record
 1987 – Atlantic Records, first generation compact disc
 1994 – Mobile Fidelity Gold CD
 1998 – Rhino Records R2 75203, Deluxe Edition compact disc and 180-gram vinyl record
 2020 – Atlantic Records R2 625106/603497848393, 60 Years Deluxe Edition, 2 CDs (Remastered Album + Outtakes)

Certifications

References

External links
 Liner notes and track notes, Rhino Deluxe Edition

1960 albums
Albums produced by Nesuhi Ertegun
Atlantic Records albums
Grammy Hall of Fame Award recipients
Hard bop albums
Instrumental albums
John Coltrane albums
United States National Recording Registry albums